Cythnia albida is a species of sea snail, a marine gastropod mollusk in the family Eulimidae. The species is one of two known species to exist within the genus, Cythnia, with the other one being Cythnia asteriaphila.

References

External links
 To World Register of Marine Species

Eulimidae
Gastropods described in 1864